Beyond the Years is a 2007 South Korean drama film. Celebrating director Im Kwon-taek's 100th film, it is based on the short fiction "The Wanderer of Seonhak-dong" by Lee Cheong-jun, and was presented at the 2007 Toronto International Film Festival. Despite being an informal sequel to Im's phenomenally successful Sopyonje (1993), Beyond the Years was not popular with Korean audiences.

Synopsis
Dong-ho and Song-hwa are separately adopted by Yu-bong (Im Jin-taek), a nomadic singer, and grow up as siblings. Dong-ho falls in love with Song-hwa, but he suffers from the fact that he has to call her sister and constantly fight with Yu-bong's obsession to make her a great singer. Eventually, Dong-ho leaves home. However, with his unchanging affection for Song-hwa, he keeps following traces of his love while refining his drumming skills in order to match well with her singing. This is the heart-touching love story of Song-hwa, who devotes her life and love to her talent for Pansori (a traditional Korean form of narrative song), and Dong-ho, who has devoted his life to loving her.

Cast
Cho Jae-hyun
Oh Jung-hae
Ryu Seung-ryong
Oh Seung-eun
Im Jin-taek 
Jang Min-ho
Go Soo-hee

References

External links 
 
 
 

2007 films
2007 drama films
South Korean drama films
Films about blind people
Films based on short fiction
Films directed by Im Kwon-taek
2000s Korean-language films
2000s South Korean films